King is a prominent lunar impact crater that is located on the far side of the Moon, and can not be viewed directly from Earth. The crater was named after Arthur Scott King and Edward Skinner King in 1970. Prior to that, this crater was known as Crater 211. It forms a pair with Ibn Firnas, which is only slightly larger and is attached to the northeast rim of King. To the northwest is the crater Lobachevskiy, and Guyot is located an equal distance to the north-northwest.

Description
The outer rim of King is roughly circular but with a slightly irregular appearance, particularly at the northern end. The crater displays little appearance of wear. The inner walls are terraced, particularly along the eastern side. Within the walls is a somewhat uneven interior floor. The interior is irregular and ridged, particularly in the eastern half. The elongated, Y-shaped central rise is part of a ridge that runs to the southern rim.

Due to its prominent rays, King is mapped as part of the Copernican System.

Sita crater
A tiny crater near the east-southeastern inner wall has been officially given the Indian feminine name Sita by the IAU. It is located at selenographic coordinates 4.6° N, 120.8° E, and has a diameter of 2 kilometres.

Satellite craters

By convention these features are identified on lunar maps by placing the letter on the side of the crater midpoint that is closest to King.

King Y is to the north of King, and it is now a "pool" of impact melt, filled at the time of the King impact. The name "Al-Tusi" had been suggested for King Y, but this was not approved by the IAU.  King J is a small crater to the southeast of King, and it is covered by King's ejecta blanket.

Mountain Peaks

Several mountain peaks (Montes) within King crater have been named.  The names were approved by the IAU in 1976.

Views

References

Further reading

External links

 LTO65C1 King Lunar Topographic Orthophotomap, 1974 
 LTO65D2 Katchalsky Lunar Topographic Orthophotomap, 1975 (shows west side of King)
 King Crater Flyover by Lunar and Planetary Institute
 Figures 149 to 151 and Figures 152 to 160 in Chapter 5 of APOLLO OVER THE MOON: A View From Orbit (NASA SP-362, 1978) are various views of King Crater
 From LROC:
 King Crater's Unusual Melt Pond
 King crater ejecta deposits
 Anomalous mounds on the King crater floor
 Fault scarp with impact melt in King crater
 Making a Splash at King Crater

Related articles
 
 

Impact craters on the Moon